WASP-90 is a faint 11th magnitude star located in the northern constellation Equuleus.

Properties 
WASP-69 has a classification of F6. The paper states that the stars are slightly evolved, with radius up to twice that of the Sun. WASP-69 is 55% more massive than the Sun, and almost twice as large. It radiates at 4.3 times the Sun's luminosity from its photosphere at an effective temperature of 6,430 K. Despite it being a similar age, the star has a high metallicity that is 28% greater than that of the Sun.

Planetary system 
In 2016, a bloated "hot Jupiter" was discovered orbiting the star. Due to the hosts state, the planet is irradiated.

References 

F-type subgiants
F-type main-sequence stars
Planetary systems with one confirmed planet
Equuleus